Bugui Point Lighthouse is a historic lighthouse located on Bugui Point in the town of Aroroy, in the northern tip of Masbate Island, province of Masbate, in the Philippines. It lights the entrance to the channel between Burias Island and Masbate Island and the channel between Burias and Ticao Islands leading to San Bernardino Strait.

Work on the light was started in October 1893, but worked was stopped in November 1896 with the onset of the Philippine Revolution.  Lighthouse construction was continued by the Americans in 1902 and the light was finally lit on December 1, 1902.

See also 

 List of lighthouses in the Philippines

References

External links 
 
 Maritime Safety Services Command
 Picture of Bugui Point Lighthouse
 Light Stations of Bicol at the Philippine Coast Guard Website.

Lighthouses completed in 1902
Lighthouses in the Philippines
Buildings and structures in Masbate